Bathygadinae is a subfamily of rattails in the family Macrouridae, the species of which are found in Atlantic, Indian and Pacific Ocean. These species lives in great depths. The chin barbel is usually absent in the genus Bathygadus, when present, the barbel is tiny and difficult to see without magnification. In Gadomus the chin barbel is present, usually thick and long.

References

Marine fish families
Gadiformes